Phosphoramidon is a chemical compound derived from cultures of Streptomyces tanashiensis. It is an inhibitor of the enzyme thermolysin, of the membrane metallo-endopeptidase, and of the endothelin converting enzyme.  Chemically, phosphoramidon differs from its closely related peptidase inhibitor talopeptin by a single stereocenter.

Because of its enzyme inhibitory properties, phosphoramidon is widely used as a biochemical tool.

References

External links
 The MEROPS online database for peptidases and their inhibitors: Phosphoramidon

Hydrolase inhibitors
Phosphoramidates
Tryptamines